Pangyo Techno Valley Vents Collapse was an accident in Pangyo Techno Valley, South Korea on 17 October 2014, when some spectators at a nearby concert were crushed by underground car park ventilation cover.

References

2014 in South Korea
Bundang